Haskell County (county code HS) is a county located in the U.S. state of Kansas. As of the 2020 census, the county population was 3,780. Its county seat and most populous city is Sublette.

History
Haskell County was founded in 1887. It was named for Dudley C. Haskell, a former member of Congress.

Origin of the Spanish flu pandemic
Historian John M. Barry concluded that Haskell County was the location of the first outbreak of the 1918 flu pandemic (nicknamed "Spanish flu"), which killed between 21 and 100 million people. Dr. Loring Miner, a Haskell County doctor, warned the editors of Public Health Reports of the U.S. Public Health Service about the new and more deadly variant of the virus. It produced the common influenza symptoms with a new intensity: "violent headache and body aches, high fever, non-productive cough. . . . This was violent, rapid in its progress through the body, and sometimes lethal. This influenza killed. Soon dozens of patients—the strongest, the healthiest, the most robust people in the county—were being struck down as suddenly as if they had been shot."   Barry writes that in the first six months of 1918, Miner's warning of "the influenza of a severe type" was the only reference in that journal to influenza anywhere in the world. 
Haskell County, Kansas, is the first recorded instance anywhere in the world of an outbreak of influenza so unusual that a physician warned public health officials. It remains the first recorded instance suggesting that a new virus was adapting, violently, to man. 
If the virus did not originate in Haskell, there is no good explanation for how it arrived there. There were no other known outbreaks anywhere in the United States from which someone could have carried the disease to Haskell and no suggestions of influenza outbreaks in either newspapers or reflected in vital statistics anywhere else in the region. And unlike the 1916 outbreak in France, one can trace with perfect definiteness the route of the virus from Haskell to the outside world.

Miner's report was not published until April 1918 and it failed to collect the attention it needed. It was not until after 2000 that historians' research revealed the origin of one of the deadliest epidemics in human history.

Historians have generally reported that the path of the disease from Haskell to the world occurred when newly inducted soldiers from the county traveled 200 miles from the county to Camp Funston (now Fort Riley) and were then deployed to Europe at the beginning of United States involvement in World War I.

However, Haskell County's role in the pandemic is widely disputed. Many pathologists believe that Haskell County did not play a role in the virus's origin and that historical accounts are entirely coincidental.

Surviving the Dust Bowl
The railroad and the development of oil and gas fields in the 1930s, and the locating of many deep wells for irrigation significantly improved the economy of the area helping overcome the "dust bowl" of that period. Haskell County was one of the hardest hit counties in the Midwest during the drought of 1930–1937.

The first rodeo and fair was held in Sublette in 1916 and the fair continues at the same location. The first school district was founded in Santa Fe in 1887. Amanda I. Watkins, who owned a considerable amount of land in the county, was named "World Wheat Queen" in 1926.

Geography

Haskell County is the flattest county in Kansas.

Adjacent counties
 Finney County (north)
 Gray County (east)
 Meade County (southeast)
 Seward County (south)
 Stevens County (southwest)
 Grant County (west)
 Kearny County (northwest)

Demographics

As of the U.S. Census in 2000, there were 4,307 people, 1,481 households, and 1,153 families residing in the county.  The population density was 8 people per square mile (3/km2).  There were 1,639 housing units at an average density of 3 per square mile (1/km2).  The racial makeup of the county was 85.07% White, 0.63% Asian, 0.58% Native American, 0.19% Black or African American, 11.45% from other races, and 2.09% from two or more races. Hispanic or Latino of any race were 23.57% of the population.

There were 1,481 households, out of which 43.60% had children under the age of 18 living with them, 69.40% were married couples living together, 5.90% had a female householder with no husband present, and 22.10% were non-families. 20.10% of all households were made up of individuals, and 9.20% had someone living alone who was 65 years of age or older.  The average household size was 2.88 and the average family size was 3.35.

In the county, the population was spread out, with 32.90% under the age of 18, 9.10% from 18 to 24, 27.80% from 25 to 44, 19.50% from 45 to 64, and 10.60% who were 65 years of age or older.  The median age was 31 years. For every 100 females there were 103.30 males.  For every 100 females age 18 and over, there were 98.30 males.

The median income for a household in the county was $38,634, and the median income for a family was $43,354. Males had a median income of $31,296 versus $22,857 for females. The per capita income for the county was $17,349.  About 8.00% of families and 11.60% of the population were below the poverty line, including 15.40% of those under age 18 and 9.40% of those age 65 or over.

Government

Presidential elections
As do most counties in rural western Kansas, Haskell County leans heavily Republican. However, in 2016, the Democratic presidential nominee, Hillary Clinton,. The last time Haskell County was carried by a Democratic presidential nominee was 1964, when Lyndon B. Johnson won the county as part of his nationwide landslide victory.

Laws
Although the Kansas Constitution was amended in 1986 to allow the sale of alcoholic liquor by the individual drink with the approval of voters, Haskell County has remained a prohibition, or "dry", county.

Education

Unified school districts
 Sublette USD 374
 Satanta USD 507

Communities

Cities
 Satanta
 Sublette (county seat)

Unincorporated community
 Tice

Ghost town
 Santa Fe (historical)

Townships
Haskell County is divided into three townships.  None of the cities within the county are considered governmentally independent, and all figures for the townships include those of the cities.  In the following table, the population center is the largest city (or cities) included in that township's population total, if it is of a significant size.

See also
 High Plains (United States)
 Great Plains

References

Further reading

External links

County
 
 Haskell County - Directory of Public Officials
Maps
 Haskell County Maps: Current, Historic, KDOT
 Kansas Highway Maps: Current, Historic, KDOT
 Kansas Railroad Maps: Current, 1996, 1915, KDOT and Kansas Historical Society

 
Kansas counties
1887 establishments in Kansas
Populated places established in 1887